Triunia is a national park in South East Queensland, Australia, 92 km north of Brisbane.

See also

 Protected areas of Queensland

References 

National Parks on the Sunshine Coast, Queensland
Protected areas established in 1994
1994 establishments in Australia